The Day My Butt Went Psycho! is an Australian/Canadian animated television series  based loosely upon the novel series of a similar name by Andy Griffiths. The show premiered on the Australian television channel Nine Network in September 2013 and on Teletoon and on the Canadian version of Cartoon Network.

Plot
The series, played out as an episodic comedy as opposed to a story-based narrative as the novels were, features Zack Freeman, a junior butt fighter, his butt Deuce and Eleanor Sterne, the daughter of legendary butt fighter Silas Sterne.

Cast
Deven Mack as Zackary "Zack" Henry Freeman
Robert Tinkler as Deuce
Bryn McAuley as Eleanor Sterne
Kedar Brown as Silas Sterne
Julie Lemieux as Gran
Ted Dykstra as The Great White Butt
Mark Edwards as The Prince
Joe Pingue as Maurice

Additional cast
Juan Chioran
Linda Kash
Paul Soles
Zachary Bennett
Christian Potenza
Dan Chameroy
Jamie Watson
Sean Cullen
Ron Pardo
Rick Jones
Dwayne Hill
Sunday Muse
Jayne Eastwood
Lauren Collins
Ron Rubin
Aron Tager
David Berni
Scott McCord
Patrick McKenna

Episodes

Series overview

Season 1 (2014)
This season was televised on Teletoon and Télétoon from June 12, 2014.

Season 2 (2015)

The second season was released on Netflix on June 30, 2015.

Broadcast
The series aired on Okto in Singapore, and TVNZ 2 in New Zealand. The series also debuted on Cartoon Network Canada in 2017

References

Canadian children's animated adventure television series
Canadian children's animated comedy television series
Australian children's animated adventure television series
Australian children's animated comedy television series
2014 Canadian television series debuts
2015 Canadian television series endings
Teletoon original programming
Television series by Nelvana
2010s Canadian animated television series
2013 Australian television series debuts
2010s Australian animated television series